Krušetnica is a large village and municipality in Námestovo District in the Žilina Region of northern Slovakia.

History
In historical records the village was first mentioned in 1580.

Geography
The municipality lies at an altitude of 656 metres and covers an area of 16.559 km². It has a population of about 930 people.

External links
https://web.archive.org/web/20070513023228/http://www.statistics.sk/mosmis/eng/run.html

Villages and municipalities in Námestovo District